Slate Mills is an unincorporated community in Ross County, in the U.S. state of Ohio. Slate Mills is home to a local purveyor of fine fish bait products including goldfish, salty's bluegill, yellow-bellies, water leeches, crappie, nightcrawlers, green worms, red worms, and mealworms.

History
The namesake Slate Mills was a mill built at the site in 1827. A post office called Slate Mills was established in 1860, and remained in operation until 1906.

References

Unincorporated communities in Ross County, Ohio
Unincorporated communities in Ohio